SJKC Han Chiang ( 韩江小学) is a national-type primary school located in Lim Lean Teng Road, Penang, Malaysia.

See also
 Han Chiang High School
 Han Chiang College
 Han Chiang School

Schools in Penang
Educational institutions established in 1919
Chinese-language schools in Malaysia
Primary schools in Malaysia
1919 establishments in British Malaya